Leanne Li Yanan (born 25 November 1984) is a Chinese-born Canadian actress and television host. She was the 2005 Miss Chinese International Pageant winner hailing from Vancouver, British Columbia.

Early life
Leanne's family originates from Shanghai, China who later emigrated when she was a child. The eldest of two girls, she was a second year fine arts student at the University of British Columbia before participating in the pageants.

Pageant career
At the age of 20, Leanne competed as contestant #10 in Miss Chinese Vancouver 2004 pageant, taking the crown. She also took the titles of Miss Photogenic and Best Posture. As the winner of this pageant, she represented the city of Vancouver at Miss Chinese International in the following year.

In January, she arrived in Hong Kong to compete for the Miss Chinese International 2005 crown, and won. Being considered just a favorite, she beat out bigger favorite, Fala Chen of New York for the title. Her performance received positive reviews, especially during the final interview portion.

Personal life
Leanne, in particular, is a Protestant. During the 48th TVB anniversary celebration, Wong Cho-lam proposed to her. Li and Wong married on Valentine's Day in 2015. Leanne and her husband Wong Cho-lam are both devoted Christians who have both publicly declared sexual abstinence before marriage. She gave birth to her daughter Gabrielle Wong on 17 December 2018. In Dec 2020, Leanne welcomed the birth of her second daughter Hayley.

TV dramas
La Femme Desperado (2006) - Guest Appearance
Love Guaranteed (2006)
Dicey Business (2006)
Drive of Life (2007)
The Building Blocks of Life (2007)
War of In-Laws II (2008) - Guest Appearance
Forensic Heroes 2 (2008)
The Money-Maker Recipe (2008)
Burning Flame III (2009)
The Stew of Life (2009)
Suspects in Love (2010) - Guest Appearance
The Mysteries of Love (2010) - Guest Appearance
Only You (2011)
The Other Truth (2011) - Guest Appearance
Men with No Shadows (2011) - Guest Appearance
No Good Either Way (2012)
A Great Way to Care II (2013)
Brother's Keeper (2013)
Ruse of Engagement (2014)
Black Heart White Soul (2014)
Shades of Life (2014)
Come On, Cousin (2014)
With or Without You (2015)
Fashion War (2016)

Film
Blackhat (2015) as Emergency Worker

References

External links
 Official Blog

1984 births
Living people
Actresses from Shanghai
Actresses from Vancouver
Chinese emigrants to Canada
Canadian Christians
Canadian expatriates in Hong Kong
Canadian film actresses
Canadian television actresses
Canadian television hosts
Miss Chinese International winners
Naturalized citizens of Canada
TVB actors
University of British Columbia alumni
Chinese Christians
Chinese women television presenters
Canadian women television hosts
Hong Kong Christians
Hong Kong Protestants